The 2000 Copa del Rey Final was a football match between Atlético Madrid and Espanyol that took place on 27 May 2000 to decide the winner of the 1999–2000 Copa del Rey, the 98th staging of Spain's primary football cup.

The match was played at the Estadio Mestalla, Valencia CF's home stadium, with Espanyol beating Atlético Madrid 2–1 and earning their third ever Copa del Rey title.

Route to the final

Match

Details

References 

2000
1
Atlético Madrid matches
RCD Espanyol matches
21st century in Valencia